Mahmut Yavuz (born 1982) is a Turkish Navy officer, who serves, currently as a lieutenant, in the SAT Commando (Underwater Attack) unit of the Marines and Special Forces. He is best known for his successful career as an ultramarathon runner and his indistinct fast speech. He holds many records and currently works as a running instructor.

Mahmut Yavuz was born in 1982. At the age of 14, he entered the Naval High School on the island Heybeliada in Istanbul. After finishing high school, he attended the Naval Academy in Tuzla, Istanbul. He graduated with a BSc degree in computer engineering. He was commissioned as an officer of the SAT Commando (Underwater Attack) at the Turkish Navy Marines and Special Forces, a similar unit to the Underwater Demolition Team of the United States Navy SEALs. As of November 2013, Yavuz has the rank of a navy lieutenant, and is stationed in Keçilik village at Anadolu Kavağı, Beykoz, Istanbul.

Sports career
Mahmut Yavuz used to perform running sport during high school and academy years, participating in competitions. Following his graduation from the naval academy, he began to run half marathons and marathons. In later years, Yavuz became interested in ultra running. In 2012, he debuted in ultramarathon running as he took part in the  İznik Ultramarathon. In order to be prepared for the ultramarathons, he trains around  within the week. Due to his strict duty times, he participates at the single-stage competitions on weekends, and at multiday races only during his vacation.

He lately ran in ultramarathons with extreme conditions in Turkey, China and Republic of South Africa. Mahmut Yavuz admits that the training in terms of physical and psychological endurance he received during the SAT commando courses is an absolutely significant advantage at this type of competition.

Yavuz won the DASK Anatolian Mountain Marathon held at Mount Bolu on 5–6 July 2013 together with his teammate İlyas Avcı. After attesting his first rank at the desert-concept event of Runfire Cappadocia Ultra in 2013, he placed second at the  Kalahari Augrabies Extreme Marathon held on 19–25 October 2013 in the Republic of South Africa.

References

1982 births
Living people
Place of birth missing (living people)
Naval Academy (Turkey) alumni
Turkish Navy officers
Turkish male long-distance runners
Turkish male marathon runners
Turkish mountain runners
Turkish ultramarathon runners
Male ultramarathon runners